The Old City Hall and Engine House is a historic municipal building at Annapolis, Anne Arundel County, Maryland, United States.  It is a -story, three bay brick building built 1821–1822 by the City of Annapolis. It was the first structure erected by the city for municipal purposes. On the first floor was the fire station, with a meeting room for the town council above. In 1868 the city sold the building for commercial purposes.

The Old City Hall and Engine House was listed on the National Register of Historic Places in 1973.

References

External links
, including photo from 1994, at Maryland Historical Trust

Buildings and structures in Annapolis, Maryland
Infrastructure completed in 1822
Former seats of local government
National Register of Historic Places in Annapolis, Maryland
Fire stations on the National Register of Historic Places in Maryland
City and town halls on the National Register of Historic Places in Maryland
1822 establishments in Maryland